De Sanctis may refer to:

People

Antonio De Sanctis, Italian bobsledder
Benedetto de Sanctis, Bishop of Alessano (1540–1542)
Cesare De Sanctis (businessman) (died 1881), friend of Giuseppe Verdi
Francesco de Sanctis (architect), Italian architect
Francesco de Sanctis (critic) (1817–1883), Italian literary critic
Gaetano De Sanctis (1870–1957), Italian historian and lifetime senator (1950–1957)
Gerardine DeSanctis, American management theorist
Giacomo de Sanctis, Archbishop of Sorrento (1474–1479)
Giovanni de Sanctis, Italian astronomer at the Osservatorio Astronomico di Torino (Astronomical Observatory of Turin) in Turin, Italy
Giuseppe De Sanctis, Italian painter
Guglielmo de Sanctis (1829–1911), Italian painter
Italo De Sanctis, Italian painter
Laura de Sanctis, Panamanian model and actress
St Michael de Sanctis (1591–1625), Discalced Trinitarian priest from Vic, Catalonia
Morgan De Sanctis (born 1977), Italian football goalkeeper
Sante De Sanctis (1862–1935), Italian doctor, psychologist and psychiatrist

Places
Castello De Sanctis, medieval castle in Roccacasale, Province of L'Aquila, Abruzzo, Italy
Morra De Sanctis, town (commune) in the province of Avellino, Campania, Italy.

Other
3268 De Sanctis (1981 DD), Main-belt Asteroid discovered in 1981
De Locis Sanctis, book by the Irish monk Adomnán
DeSanctis–Cacchione syndrome, an extremely rare disorder characterized by the skin and eye symptoms of xeroderma pigmentosum

See also
DeSanctis, a surname
DeSantis

Italian-language surnames